The Missing Gospels: Unearthing the Truth Behind Alternative Christianities is a book by Darrell L. Bock, Research Professor of New Testament Studies at Dallas Theological Seminary. The book is concerned with later alternative gospels and 'Christianities' associated with the Nag Hammadi discoveries of 1945. The book focuses on the claims of early Christian diversity, the origins of Gnosticism, as well as the theology of the later alternative texts and communities.

The book contains a foreword by Edwin M. Yamauchi.

Reception
The book contains numerous endorsements by prominent Christian New Testament scholars and academics including Larry Hurtado, Martin Hengel, Donald Hagner, Craig A. Evans, Craig L. Blomberg and Scot McKnight.

References

External links
 The Missing Gospels
 Excerpt of The Missing Gospels
 The Missing Gospels, Google Books

2006 non-fiction books
Books about ancient Christianity
Thomas Nelson (publisher) books